Coriolano is both an Italian surname and a masculine Italian given name. Notable people with the name include:

Bartolomeo Coriolano, Italian Baroque engraver
Cristoforo Coriolano, German Renaissance engraver
Giovanni Battista Coriolano (1590–1649), Italian Baroque engraver
Theresa Maria Coriolano (1620–1671), Italian Baroque engraver
Coriolano Cippico (1425–1493), Dalmatian nobleman
Coriolano Vighi (1846–1905), Italian painter

Italian-language surnames
Italian masculine given names